The 2017–18 Cypriot Cup was the 76th edition of the Cypriot Cup. A total of 22 clubs were accepted to enter the competition. It began on 29 November 2019 with the first round and concluded on 16 May 2018 with the final held at GSP Stadium. The winner of the Cup was AEK Larnaca for second time and qualified for the 2018–19 Europa League second qualifying round.

First round
The first round draw took place on 6 November 2017 and the matches were played on 29 November and 6,13 December 2017.

Second round
The second round draw took place on 21 December 2017.

The following ten teams advanced directly to second round and will meet the six winners of the first round ties:
Apollon Limassol (2016–17 Cypriot Cup winner)
APOEL (2016–17 Cypriot Cup runners-up)
Doxa Katokopias (2016–17 Cypriot First Division Fair Play winner)
Omonia (via draw)
Aris Limassol (via draw)
Nea Salamina (via draw)
AEK Larnaca (via draw)
Ermis Aradippou (via draw)
Karmiotissa (via draw)
PAEEK (via draw)

|}

First leg

Second leg

Quarter-finals
The quarter-finals draw took place on 20 February 2018 and the matches were played on 28 February, 7, 14 March and 11 April 2018.

|}

First leg

Second leg

Semi-finals
The semi-finals draw took place on 12 April 2018 and the matches were played on 18 and 25 April 2018.

|}

First Leg

Second Leg

Final

See also	
 2017–18 Cypriot First Division	
 2017–18 Cypriot Second Division

References

	

Cup
Cyprus
Cypriot Cup seasons